Benjaberring is a small town in the Wheatbelt region of Western Australia located in the Shire of Wyalcatchem.
The name of the town originates from the Aboriginal name of a nearby water source.
The name of the area first appears on charts in 1846; the town site was first declared as Benjabbering in 1910, but the spelling was changed to Benjaberring in 1911 to more accurately reflect the correct pronunciation.
In 1927 - the wheat statistics were showing over 2,000 tons annually for the years 1924/1925, and 1925/1926.

In 1932 it was the location of a railway siding and was one of five bulk grain receival locations that was the beginning of the Cooperative Bulk Handling organisation now known as the CBH Group.

References 

Wheatbelt (Western Australia)
Grain receival points of Western Australia